Nicolas Robert Bouchard-Chantereaux (8 September 1802 – 22 November 1864) was a French geologist and zoologist interested in malacology and marine biology. He was President de l'Administration du Muséum d'Histoire Naturelle Boulogne (collections now in Musée d'Histoire Naturelle de Lille).

Bouchard-Chanteraux wrote Catalogue des mollusques marins observés jusqu'à ce jour à l'état vivant sur les côtes du Boulonnais  Boulogne, Impr. de Le Roy-Mabille online published in 1829 and
Catalogue des mollusques terrestres et fluviatiles observés jusqu'à ce jour à l'état vivant dans le département du Pas-de-Calais Boulogne, Impr. de Le Roy-Mabille published in 1838 online here and Catalogue des Crustacés observés jusqu'a ce jour a l'état vivant dans le Boulonnais 1833

Bouchard-Chanteraux collected fossils alongside Pierre-Nicolas Dutertre Delporte, Administrateur du Muséum, à Boulogne.
Among the magnificent collections of Mr. Bouchard should be especially admired his Brachiopods: immense series of certain species collected with paternal care of immense series which capture all the nuances possible, differences in age, size, relationships with such or such other closely related species. Mr. Bouchard drawers are more precious than any book teaching! I couldn't tire of admire these beautiful series. Among the most remarkable and the most useful for geologists coming to visit the Boulonnais Eugène Eudes-Deslongchamps.His collections included Jurassic fish studied by Louis Agassiz.

Depuis longtemps déjà Dutertre-Delporte recueillait des débris de poissons fossiles; de son côté Bouchard-Chantereaux en accumulait dans ses riches collections paléontologiques. Les auteurs classiques avaient connaissance des espèces que possédaient les deux naturalistes. Egerton adonné, dans la famille des Chimères, le nom de Dutertre à un individu du genre Ischyodus. Gervais, dans sa Zoologie et Géologie Françaises cite Bouchard à propos d'un Ibodus.

Bouchard-Chanteraux described the snail Catinella arenaria

The brachiopod Soaresirhynchia bouchardi Davidson 1852 honours his name as do the fossil sharks Lamna bouchardi Sauvage , 1867 (Cretolamna bouchardi) and Ischyodus bouchardi Sauvage, 1867. Other name bearers are the fossil echinoid Hemipedina bouchardi Wright and the fossil bivalve Isognomon bouchardi Oppel

See also
Henri Émile Sauvage

References
Digitised works at Gallica (Bibliothèque nationale de France) via Bouchard-Chanteraux search
BnF catalogue
Les débuts de la paléoichthyologie en Normandie et dans le Boulonnais Arnaud Brignon
 Mémoires de la Société académique de l'arrondissement de Boulogne-sur-Mer 1866, 1867
Bouchard-Chantereaux collectionneur et scientifique amateur, par le Dr Vadet Statuts de la Société Académique du Boulonnais 1985 Société Académique du Boulonnais (home)

French zoologists
French geologists
1864 deaths
1802 births
French malacologists